María del Rocío "Rossy" Moreno León (born October 17, 1965) is a Mexican luchadora, or female professional wrestler. In AAA she is a former AAA Reina de Reinas Champion and a two-time Mexican National Women's Champion.

Personal life
Moreno is a member of an extended wrestling family founded by her father Alfonso Moreno who was both a wrestler and a wrestling promoter and her mother who took over promoting wrestling in Arena Azteca Budokan in Nezahualcoyotl, Mexico State after Alfonso Moreno died. Rossy's sisters Esther, Cynthia and Alda Moreno are or have been professional wrestlers as well as her brother who works as El Oriental. She is the ex-wife of Dr. Wagner Jr. and they have a son who wrestles as El Hijo de Dr. Wagner Jr.

Championships and accomplishments
Lucha Libre AAA Worldwide
AAA Reina de Reinas Championship (1 time)
Consejo Mundial de Lucha Libre
Mexican National Women's Championship (2 times)

References

1965 births
20th-century professional wrestlers
Mexican female professional wrestlers
Living people
Professional wrestlers from Mexico City
AAA Reina de Reinas Champions